A name reaction is a chemical reaction named after its discoverers or developers. Among the tens of thousands of organic reactions that are known, hundreds of such reactions are well-known enough to be named after people. Well-known examples include the Grignard reaction, the Sabatier reaction, the Wittig reaction, the Claisen condensation, the Friedel-Crafts acylation, and the Diels-Alder reaction.  Books have been published devoted exclusively to name reactions; the Merck Index, a chemical encyclopedia, also includes an appendix on name reactions.

As organic chemistry developed during the 20th century, chemists started associating synthetically useful reactions with the names of the discoverers or developers; in many cases, the name is merely a mnemonic. Some cases of reactions that were not really discovered by their namesakes are known. Examples include the Pummerer rearrangement, the Pinnick oxidation and the Birch reduction.

Although systematic approaches for naming reactions based on the reaction mechanism or the overall transformation exist (such as the IUPAC Nomenclature for Transformations), the more descriptive names are often unwieldy or not specific enough, so people names are often more practical for efficient communication.

See also
 List of organic reactions

References